Erepsocassis is a genus of tortoise beetles in the family Chrysomelidae, containing a single species, E. rubella.

References

Further reading

 
 
 
 

Cassidinae
Beetles described in 1862
Monotypic Chrysomelidae genera
Articles created by Qbugbot